"Attention" is a bugle call sounded as a warning that troops are about to be called to attention.

"Attention" was also used for custom automobile horns in the 1930s and 1940s, and is most recognizable for that reason.

References

Bugle calls